The Ardeleni is a left tributary of the river Apa Mare in Romania. It discharges into the Apa Mare in Vinga.

References

Rivers of Romania
Rivers of Arad County